This is an incomplete list of neighborhoods/subdivisions in Missouri City, Texas, listed in alphabetical order.

A

B

Brightwater

C

D

E

F
Fondren Park

G

H

Hunters Glen

I

J

K

L

Lake Olympia
Lakes of Brightwater

M

Meadowcreek

N

O

P

Q

Quail Valley

• Quail Trace

R

Riverstone

S

Sienna Plantation

T

U

V 
Vicksburg

W

References

External links
 Missouri City GIS Mapping: Subdivisions 

Texas geography-related lists
Lists of neighborhoods in U.S. cities